= UCTV =

UCTV may refer to:

- UCTV, University of California Television (uctv.tv)
- UCTV (University of Connecticut), University of Connecticut Student Television
